is an anime television series produced by ZUIYO Enterprise that aired on NTV on 1 July 1983, ending on 23 December. The series was based on the Serendipity books by Stephen Cosgrove and character designs for the animation version were done by Yōichi Kotabe. After a boy is shipwrecked on a deserted island, he finds a pink egg which hatches into the pink dragon (referred to as a dinosaur in the English-language theme song) Serendipity. The series follows their adventures on the island.

A feature-length English dub consisting of episodes from the TV series, directed by Jim Terry (Force Five), was released on home video in the United States on 
March 9, 1989, by Celebrity Home Entertainment. The boy's name was changed from Kōna to "Bobby" in the English version. The TV series itself has also been aired in France, as Biniky le Dragon Rose (Biniky the Pink Dragon), in Italy as Rosaura, in Iran as Serendipity and in Spain as Biniki, el dragón rosa. There hasn't been a DVD release of the English dub as of 2017.

Story
A boy named Kona, has an accident with his parents who was investigating the Southern Ocean, and flows to the isolated Pure Island in the South Sea with a large pink egg. The pink sea dragon Serendipity, born from the pink egg, and Kona, who is both deeply moved, are allowed to live on the island with the mermaid named Lola, who is the queen of Pure Island, and even the residents of Pure Island can be disappointed. However, the villain, captain Smudge, attack by aiming at the treasure Tear of the mermaid on the island. Kona, Serendipity, Lola and the other members of the island must work together to preserve the peace of Pure Island.

Characters
 Serendipity
 Voiced by Mari Okamoto A mysterious pink sea dragon lady. She protects the inhabitants of Pure Island with Kona, but is also playful.

 Kona
 Voiced by Michiko Nomura A boy who decided to live on Pure Island after drifting. He is curious and hard to lose. Eventually, he fell in love with Pure Island and its inhabitants, and fighting enemies who is trying to harm them.

 Pira-Pira
 Voiced by Yūji Mitsuya A colorful talking parakeet. Kona first met him in a cage on a ship on an expedition to the South Pole and released him for his flying freedom. Although he sometimes spoiled Kona, Serendipity and the inhabitants of Pure Island, he is even a good friend with them.

 Captain Smudge
 Voiced by Kōsei Tomita Although he is the captain of his ship Ombolo, his only crew is Mudlark, his bird on his shoulder. He is greedy and pretending to be a big pirate. He is trying to get the treasure of Pure Island, "The mermaid tear" and Serendipity.

 Prime Minister Dolf
 Voiced by Kei Tomiyama Prime minister of Pure Island. He is also the chairman of the World Congress of Fish Representatives. He has a gentle personality and loves princess Laura, and feels like a father for her. He has a good understanding and is an adviser of Kona and Serendipity.

 Princess Laura
 Voiced by Yuri Nashiwa A pretty mermaid princess who lives in the palace. She is also the queen of Pure Island. Her parents were killed by humans and she hated humans as enemies, but becomes friend with Kona, who has a pure heart.

 Akanatsu the Fruit Spirit
 Voiced by Noriko Tsukase

 Minta
 Voiced by Rihoko Yoshida

Miscellaneous characters
 Mudlark
 Captain Smudge's pet raven.

 Long
 A shark in the Pure Island.

 Chap & Mestle
 Voiced by Hirotaka Suzuoki (Chap) Two flying fishes in the Pure Island. Chap is a blue male and Mestle is a red female.

 Nulu Nulu
 An eel in the Pure Island.

 Kachi Kachi & Puly
 Voiced by Tetsuo Mizutori (Kachi Kachi) A crab couple in the Pure Island. Kachi Kachi is male and Puly is female. They have three children.

 The Tentecks
 Inhabitants in the Pure Island.

 The Moais
 A group of spiritual high rocks.

Cast

Additional Voices
Cleo Rae
Mr. Angelo
Cody Walker
David Monson
Ginny Masters
Harry Metrano
Danielle Romeo
Andrea Deschamps
Geoffrey Deschamps 
Uncredited
Bob Bergen - Prof. Abraham
Barbara Goodson - Narrator, Bobby's Mother

Episodes

Sources:

References

External links
 ピュア島の仲間たち (cast and credits list)
Animeflv
 

1983 anime television series debuts
Adventure anime and manga
Dinosaurs in anime and manga
Animated television series about dragons
Television shows based on children's books